Lem's Law is an adage suggested  by the Polish science-fiction writer and philosopher Stanisław Lem. It is best known from his faux review "Jedna Minuta" ["One Minute"] of the non-existing book One Human Minute (1984), but he formulated it in his correspondence already in 1978.

Lem's Law, as translated in English, is stated as follows:
"No one reads; if someone does read, he doesn’t understand; if he understands, he immediately forgets."

The "reviewed" fictional book One Human Minute is supposedly an ideal book which addresses the concern expressed in "Lem's Law".

Lem's Law follows the structure of the argument about the non-existence of the world and the impossibility of knowledge and communication about it (even if it could exist) presented by Gorgias of Leontinoi.

In an interview to Marek Oramus, who asked Lem how he came up with his law, Lem said that it resulted from his pondering upon the immense flood of publications with an inevitable repetitiveness of various conclusions. And the third part is valid, e.g., because a person has to free some space in his head for yet another piece of information.

Lem's Law is related to what  called the "Ignorance explosion". 
In Poland, Lem's Law is often referred to as an expression of the conviction that the overall level of literacy and general education declines.
More generally, it has also been used as a humorous description of Lem's critique of the contemporary state of our civilization.

Notes

References 

Stanisław Lem
Adages
Principles